Kranjec is a Slovene surname. Notable people with the surname include:

 David Kranjec (born 1994), Slovene-Australian figure skater
 Igor Kranjec (born 1972), Slovene cyclist
 Miško Kranjec (1908–1983), Slovene writer
 Robert Kranjec (born 1981), Slovene ski jumper
 Žan Kranjec (born 1992), Slovene ski racer

See also
 

Slovene-language surnames